Safiath, the stage name of Safia Aminami Issoufou Oumarou (born April 15, 1982), is a Nigerien singer, rapper, and songwriter.

Safiath was born in Khartoum, and is ethnically Tuareg and Zarma; her mother is Sudanese, while her father is Nigerien. It was he who told her that she could become anything she wanted, other than a fashion designer; consequently she went to Morocco to study economics and banking. It was while there, in Rabat, that she joined a group that performed salsa, in which she played guitar; she then returned to Niger, where she found it easier to gain work as a musician than using her degrees. She is the lead singer of the rap group Kaidan Gaskiya, but has sung a variety of other genres as well. Many of her songs, which are performed in languages such as French, Hausa, Zarma and Tamasheq, deal with social issues, similar to those of Zara Moussa; children's rights in particular are a popular theme in her work, and she has spoken of a desire to raise consciousness in a younger generation with her songs. Safiath is married to the rapper Phéno, with whom she has a child. She has represented Niger in numerous international musical competitions, including the 2013 Jeux de la Francophonie in Nice, and has spoken of  wish that her countrymen would listen more to the music of their native land and less to more popular music; she has also said that she feels that Nigerien rap is declining in quality as it takes on more and more foreign influences, especially from French and American performers. Outside of Niger, Safiath has also collaborated with artists from other African nations during her performing career.

References

1982 births
Living people
People from Khartoum
21st-century Nigerien male singers
Nigerien women rappers
Tuareg people
Zarma people
Nigerien people of Sudanese descent